Gheorghe Tóth-Bedö (1895 – 1946) was a Romanian footballer who played as a midfielder.

International career
Gheorghe Tóth-Bedö played one match for Romania, on 2 September 1923 under coach Teofil Morariu in a friendly which ended 1–1 against Poland.

Honours
Chinezul Timișoara
Divizia A: 1921–22, 1922–23, 1923–24

References

External links
 

1895 births
1946 deaths
Romanian footballers
Romania international footballers
Place of birth missing
Association football midfielders
Liga I players
Chinezul Timișoara players